Richard Herbert Moran (2 May 1887 – 11 October 1940) was an Australian rules footballer who played with Carlton in the Victorian Football League (VFL).

Notes

External links 

Richard Moran's profile at Blueseum

1887 births
1940 deaths
Australian rules footballers from Melbourne
Australian Rules footballers: place kick exponents
Carlton Football Club players
North Melbourne Football Club (VFA) players
People from North Melbourne